Kuriko (written: 久里子) is a feminine Japanese given name. Notable people with the name include:

, Japanese handball player
, Japanese actress

Japanese feminine given names